Leire Landa Iroz (born 19 December 1986) is a Spanish former footballer who most recently played as a defender for Primera División club FC Barcelona and the Spain women's national football team. She also played for Real Sociedad, Atlético Madrid and Athletic Bilbao.

International career
In June 2013 national team coach Ignacio Quereda selected Landa in the Spain squad for UEFA Women's Euro 2013 in Sweden. She was also part of Spain's team at the 2015 FIFA Women's World Cup in Canada.

Personal
She wore the 23 shirt at Atlético in homage to former footballer Iván de la Peña, well known for his shaved head, who was an inspirational model when she suffered from Burkitt's lymphoma as a child.

Honours
 Barcelona
 Primera División: 2014–15

 Athletic Bilbao
 Copa de la Reina: runner-up 2014

References

External links
 
 
 Profile at FC Barcelona
 
 

1986 births
Living people
Sportspeople from Irun
Footballers from the Basque Country (autonomous community)
Spanish women's footballers
Spain women's international footballers
Primera División (women) players
Atlético Madrid Femenino players
Athletic Club Femenino players
Women's association football fullbacks
FC Barcelona Femení players
2015 FIFA Women's World Cup players
Real Sociedad (women) players
Oiartzun KE players
21st-century Spanish women